Freys Hill is a neighborhood of the U.S. city of Louisville, Kentucky, located along Freys Hill Road and Westport Road. It is sometimes referred to by its largest subdivision and accompanying shopping center, Springhurst.

References

Neighborhoods in Louisville, Kentucky